Pietro Tribuno (died 912) was the Doge of Venice from 887 to his death.

History
He was the son of Domenico Tribuno and Agnella, the niece of Pietro Tradonico. He succeeded Pietro I Candiano, following a brief period during which the elderly and infirm Giovanni II Participazio administered the city.

Immediately after his succession, he began negotiations with the successors of Charles the Fat. In 888, he negotiated a treaty with Arnulf of Carinthia and again in 891. The first treaty secured for the jurisdiction over Venetian citizens abroad. The intent of this clause was to increase Venetian trade in the Carolingian Empire by extending to such merchants who did so trade the protection of their own laws. The economic benefits were immediate and the 890s saw growth in Venice's relatively new iron industry. Meanwhile, land reclamation continued apace.

In 898, the Magyars invaded Venetia for the first time, but this raid turned out to be a precursor to something more permanent. In 899, the whole of Lombardy was overrun. The Magyars then turned on Venice. First Cittanova, Fine, and Equilo fell, and then Altino. Finally, advancing past Chioggia and Pellestrina towards Malamocco, the Magyars arrived at Albiola to meet a vast Venetian host under Tribuno awaiting them. The Magyars used small coracles for water crossings and these proved massively inefficient against the Venetian galleys. The Magyars were routed in the first great Venetian military victory since the defeat of Pepin of Italy almost a century prior.

After the Magyar flight, Tribuno set to work improving the inner defences of the Rialto. He constructed a vast wall from eastern Olivolo to the Riva degli Schiavoni and thence to Santa Maria Zobenigo. He also stretched a gigantic chain across the Grand Canal from S. Gregorio on Dorsoduro to a site now occupied by the Palazzo Gaggia. According to the chronicler John the Deacon, writing a century later, with the construction of this wall Venice became a civitas, often translated "city;" an event marking a turning point in Venetian history.

Tribuno died in 912 and was buried in S. Zaccaria. His dogaressa was Angela Sanudo. He was succeeded by Orso II Participazio.

References

Sources
 
 https://archive.org/stream/dogaressasofveni00stal#page/314/mode/2up

912 deaths
9th-century Doges of Venice
10th-century Doges of Venice
Year of birth unknown